Vanayi may refer to:

Vanayi-ye Olya
Vanayi-ye Sofla